KABX-FM (97.5 MHz, "K97.5") is an adult contemporary formatted radio station in Merced, California. KABX-FM is owned by Stephens Media Group, through licensee SMG-Merced, LLC. Its studios are in Merced and its transmitter is southwest of Mount Bullion. KABX-FM can be heard in large areas of central California from approximately Modesto, to south of Fresno. It sometimes can be heard as far north as the eastern portions of the San Francisco Bay Area.

History
KABX-FM signed on in 1979 as an automated easy listening station with the call sign KMYT. This was the original FM sister station to KYOS AM 1480 and was originally located at the KYOS transmitter site. At the end of 1999, the station relocated to Shultz Mountain in Catheys Valley, California, to gain better signal coverage. On August 27, 2011, KABX-FM adjusted its format and became mainstream AC "The New K 97.5- Favorites of Yesterday and Today. Under the guidance of AC consultant Gary Berkowitz, the station is using JAM jingles and voiceovers from Jim Merkel.

Acquisition by Stephens Media
On July 1, 2019, Mapleton Communications announced its intent to sell its remaining 37 stations to Stephens Media Group. Stephens began operating the station that same day. The sale was consummated on September 30, 2019 at a price of $21 million.

References

Previous logo
 (KABX's logo under previous "Oldies 97.5" branding)

External links

FCC History Cards for KABX-FM

ABX
Mainstream adult contemporary radio stations in the United States
Mass media in Merced County, California
Merced, California
Radio stations established in 1979
1979 establishments in California